All Saints is the debut studio album by English-Canadian girl group All Saints. It was released on 24 November 1997 by London Records. All Saints worked with many producers on the album:  Cameron McVey, John Benson, Johnny Douglas, Karl "K-Gee" Gordon, Magnus Fiennes, Nellee Hooper, Karen Gibbs and Neville Henry.

Upon its release, the album received mixed reviews from music critics, some of whom praised the choice of singles and the group's musical direction. The album spawned three number-one singles in the United Kingdom: "Never Ever", the double A-side "Under the Bridge" and "Lady Marmalade", and "Bootie Call", as well as "I Know Where It's At" (#4) and "War of Nerves" (#7). The album sold over 5 million copies worldwide.

Singles
"I Know Where It's At" was the group's first single.  It was written by member Shaznay Lewis along with usual writing partner Karl Gordon, and contained a sample of Steely Dan's "The Fez." It was released on 18 August 1997. Commercially, the song proved to be a success worldwide, peaking in the top twenty in Canada, United Kingdom, New Zealand, Australia (where it was certified Gold), Ireland, and France. A music video was also shot, which featured the group in an urban setting.

Their second single was "Never Ever." Written by Lewis and the song's producer, Sean Mather, it was released on 10 November 1997. The song remains the group's most successful and memorable hit, peaking at number one in Australia, New Zealand and United Kingdom, and achieving top-ten status in Ireland, Sweden, Canada, The Netherlands, France, Switzerland, Norway, and Austria. The song also peaked at number four on the U.S. Billboard Hot 100, becoming the group's highest peaking single in that country.

"Under the Bridge" and "Lady Marmalade", a double A-side single, was released.  Although both songs are cover versions, they remain unique because each is lyrically altered from the original. They were released on 27 April 1998. "Under the Bridge" itself managed to chart in the top twenty in the United Kingdom, Australia, Canada, New Zealand, Finland, and Sweden. "Lady Marmalade" charted as a single in Switzerland and France, but did not perform as well as the conjoined single.

Their fourth single was "Bootie Call," released on 31 August 1998 in European countries only. It was the group's third consecutive number one in the United Kingdom, also charting in Belgium, Ireland, The Netherlands, and Sweden. A music video was also shot for the single.

The group's fifth and final single was "War of Nerves."  It was originally slated for release only in the United Kingdom on 23 November 1998, but was then released in New Zealand as well.  While not as successful as its foregoing single releases, it did chart in New Zealand, Ireland, and the United Kingdom. A music video was shot, during which group member Melanie Blatt was pregnant.

The song "Let's Get Started" was released in 1995 with only members Melanie Blatt and Shaznay Lewis, under the name All Saints 1.9.7.5. However, when the group welcomed sisters Nicole Appleton and Natalie Appleton, they renamed the group All Saints, and the title of the song was altered to "If You Wanna Party (I Found Lovin')," and featured on the album. The song was then re-recorded with the Appleton sisters, and was re-released in Japan only, in 1997. A music video was shot, which was exclusive to Japan.

Critical reception
All Saints received mixed reviews from music critics, some of whom spoke favorably of the choice of singles and the group's musical direction, while others did not enjoy the music direction, and felt they lacked personality. Nick Butler of Sputnikmusic gave it a positive review, awarding it five stars out of five. He felt that the musical direction and sound "had aged well," and praised the group's creativity, as he stated they were "considered the credible alternative to the Spice Girls." He stated, "I still enjoy the singles a lot when I hear them, if there was ever a war between the two groups, All Saints won it."

Stephen Thomas Erlewine of AllMusic did not rate the album, but gave it a mixed review. In comparison to the Spice Girls, he felt All Saints lacked "personality," but was more charitable regarding their music direction, saying, "All four members have better voices than the Spices, and they all have a hand in writing at least one of the songs on their eponymous debut. ... More importantly, they and their producers have a better sense of contemporary dance trends—there are real hip-hop and club rhythms throughout the record." He highlighted "Never Ever", "I Know Where It's At," and "Lady Marmalade" as the album's best tracks.

Commercial performance
In the United Kingdom the album debuted at number twelve for the week beginning 6 December 1997, before progressing to a peak of number two on 17 January 1998, where it remained for three consecutive weeks. It spent a total of 66 weeks on the chart. As of April 2016, the album has sold 1,469,771 copies in the United Kingdom.

It peaked within the top forty in numerous countries, and reached the top ten in Switzerland, Australia, New Zealand, Netherlands, and Canada. The album was certified Platinum in the United States for shipments of over 1 million units. The album sold over 5 million copies worldwide.

Track listing

Charts

Weekly charts

Year-end charts

Certifications and sales

References

External links
 Official site

1997 debut albums
All Saints (group) albums
Albums produced by Cameron McVey
Albums produced by Nellee Hooper